L’Amour fou (Crazy Love) is the 27th studio album of French popular singer Françoise Hardy. Released in France on November 5, 2012 on CD Virgin/EMI (5099997278726), and December 3, 2012 on LP Virgin/EMI (5099997278719).

It was published in Great Britain on April 15, 2013 on CD, Virgin/EMI (5099997278726).

27th album 
The album L’Amour fou (Crazy Love) contains ten original songs where Hardy sings over ambient piano and the Macedonian Radio Symphonic Orchestra’s string arrangements. This album marks 50 years of the singer's musical career (her debut album was released in November 1962), appearing simultaneously with a book also called L’Amour fou.
  
"My publisher wanted another book after my autobiography which met some success," she says, "and I had these stories originally written for myself many years ago. Stories exploring the pain of love. He encouraged me to rewrite them and they came out in conjunction with the album." 
On the album, Hardy swings a literary connection by turning a Victor Hugo poem into lyrics. "I liked the melody, and while I generally do not like poems, this one was a marvel of simplicity. It goes: ‘Why are you coming to see me if you have nothing to tell me?’ I like that. […] The album did not find a wide audience when issued in France. Radio did not play it. Radio only plays music for kids, and for an artist like myself who does not tour, well, I need radio."

Track listing

Personnel 
Photographer:  Gilles-Marie Zimmermann. 
Artworker:  Jean-Louis Duralek.
Instrumentalists:
Drum kit: Fabrice Moreau (3-4-6-8-9), Mathieu Pigné (5), Erick Benzi (9).
Double bass: Laurent Vernerey (3).
Guitar: Michel Aymé (7), Erick Benzi (9), François Maurin (9). 
Bass guitar: Laurent Vernerey (1-4-6-8-9), Pascal Colomb (2), Édouard Marie (5), Calogero (7). 
Electric guitar: Dominique Blanc-Francard (3), Pascal Colomb (4), Arman Méliès (5), Darko Fitzgerald (5). 
Steel-string acoustic guitar: Thierry Stremler (8).
Piano: Thierry Stremler (1-3-8), Pascal Colomb (2-4), Alain Lanty (4), Julien Noël (5), Dominique Spagnolo (7), Erick Benzi (9), François Maurin (9).
Kettledrums: Pascal Colomb (2).
Tom-tom drum: Julien Doré (5). 
String section: Macedonian Radio Symphonic Orchestra, directed by Dzjian Emin (1-3-5-7-8), Pascal Colomb (2-4), Alain Lanty (6).

Certifications and sales

References 

Françoise Hardy albums
2012 albums
French-language albums